2 Days in Paris is a 2007 romantic comedy-drama film written, produced, and directed by Julie Delpy, who also edited the film, composed the soundtrack and played the leading female role. The film also stars Adam Goldberg and Daniel Brühl. It was followed by the 2012 sequel 2 Days in New York.

Premise
Marion is a French-born photographer living in New York City with her neurotic, hypochondriacal, chain-smoking, heavily tattooed American interior designer boyfriend Jack. After a markedly unromantic trip to Venice, which was planned to re-ignite the passion in their relationship, they take a night train to Paris to pick up Marion's cat from her parents and decide to stay for two days. Jack is startled to learn Marion has remained in contact with numerous ex-lovers and becomes increasingly uncomfortable due to the language barrier and a multitude of her old flames she keeps meeting. Meanwhile, Marion wrestles with her own insecurities about love, relationships, and her impulsive nature.

Cast

Production
The film was shot on location in Paris. Sites included Gare Du Nord train station, Pasteur station in the Paris Métro and the grave of Jim Morrison in Père Lachaise Cemetery. Marie Pillet and Albert Delpy, who portray Marion's parents, are Julie Delpy's real-life parents.
It was produced by Christophe Mazodier with his company Polaris Film Production & Finance.

Distribution
The film premiered at the Berlin International Film Festival. It went into theatrical release in Germany on 17 May 2007 and was shown at the Seattle International Film Festival, the Tremblant Film Festival in Canada, the Los Angeles Film Festival, and Paris Cinéma before going into theatrical release in France on 11 July and the United States on 10 August.

Critical response
Reviews were mostly positive.  

In the Chicago Sun-Times, Roger Ebert called Julie Delpy "an original, a woman who refuses to be defined or limited" and said she "has made a smart film with an edge to it... What she has done here is avoid all temptation to recycle the usual lovers-in-Paris possibilities, and has created two original, quirky characters so obsessed with their differences that Paris is almost a distraction."

Stephen Holden of The New York Times said the film "is an inside-out version of the much-admired Richard Linklater films Before Sunrise and Before Sunset, in which Ms. Delpy and Ethan Hawke portray a French-American pair who meet, part and reunite years later. Where Mr. Linklater's movies were weepies for the kind of educated, upscale young cosmopolites who have a soft spot for romances like Casablanca, Ms. Delpy's examination of modern love among the almost young and still restless is bracingly hard-headed."

In her review for the Los Angeles Times, Carina Chocano said, "At first blush, 2 Days in Paris looks like it's going to be the story of a culture-clashing couple. But slowly and rather slyly, Delpy zeros in on something much more subtle and complex. What interests her are not the superficial differences between people from different countries... but the way in which the distances between people, genders and cultures (the very distances we rely on to grant us the perspective needed to see how completely insane other people, genders, cultures really are) seem to shift constantly according to circumstances."

Awards and nominations
Julie Delpy was nominated for the César Award for Best Writing, the European Film Awards Audience Award for Best Film, and the Independent Spirit Award for Best First Film. The film won the Coup de Cœur Award from the Mons International Festival of Love Films. It also won the Prix Jacques Prévert du Scénario for Best Original Screenplay in 2008.

Sequel
In February 2010, it was announced a sequel titled 2 Days in New York was in production. Actress/director Delpy re-teamed with Polaris Film to produce the "atypical sequel." She directed the sequel in Manhattan in October and reprised her role as Marion, a Frenchwoman who now finds herself in New York with her child and a new guy, having broken up with her 2 Days in Paris lover (and the father of her child) who was played by Goldberg.

"It's about the difficulty of relationships but also about the main character's evolution in general. It's a very modern story about the complexities of being a woman and not being completely consumed by your partner," Delpy explained. Comedian Chris Rock confirmed on The Howard Stern Show on 8 November 2010 that he was set to play the "new guy" in the film. Other members of the Paris cast, including Delpy's real father Albert, returned to their same roles for the film.

References

External links
 
 
 
 
 
 

2007 films
2007 independent films
2007 multilingual films
2007 romantic comedy-drama films
2000s English-language films
2000s French films
2000s French-language films
2000s German films
English-language French films
English-language German films
Films directed by Julie Delpy
Films set in Paris
Films shot in Paris
Films with screenplays by Julie Delpy
French independent films
French multilingual films
French romantic comedy-drama films
French-language German films
German independent films
German multilingual films
German romantic comedy-drama films